Slava Cercheză is a commune in Tulcea County, Northern Dobruja, Romania. Its name means the Cherkess (Circassian) Slava, in reference to the Dobrujan Circassian community that used to inhabit the village before the Russo-Turkish War (1877–1878). Besides the titular village, the commune also includes the village of Slava Rusă (Russian Slava).

Situated near the site of ancient Libida, the commune is home to an important Russian-speaking Lipovan community (79.9% of the population) dating from the late 17th or early 18th century. The Uspenia monastery in the village of Slava Rusă is the seat of the Orthodox Old Rite Eparchy of Slava, founded in the 19th century, with authority over most of Dobruja. The Vovidenia convent is also found in the village. 20% of the inhabitants are Romanians.

References

External links

Communes in Tulcea County
Localities in Northern Dobruja
Circassians in Romania